The xylospongium or tersorium, also known as "sponge on a stick", was a hygienic utensil used by ancient Romans to wipe their anus after defecating, consisting of a wooden stick (Greek: , xylon) with a sea sponge (Greek: , spongos) fixed at one end.

The tersorium was shared by people using public latrines. To clean the sponge, they simply washed it in a bucket with water and salt or vinegar. This became a breeding ground for bacteria, causing the spread of disease among those using the latrines such as typhoid and cholera.

In classical antiquity a xylospongium might be used as a toilet brush.

In the baths of the seven sages in Ostia, a fresco from the 2nd century contains the Inscription (u)taris xylosphongio which is the first known mention of the term. Also in the early second century a papyrus letter of Claudius Terentianus to his father Claudius Tiberianus uses the term xylespongium in a phrase.

In the middle of the first century, the Roman philosopher Seneca reported that a Germanic gladiator had committed suicide with a sponge on a stick. According to Seneca, the gladiator hid himself in the latrine of an amphitheater and pushed the wooden stick into his gullet and choked to death.

See also
 Bidet shower
 Shit stick

Citations

General references

Primary sources 
 Claudius Terentianus, Michigan Papyri VIII 471 (inv. 5393) = CEL 146 = ChLA XLII 1220 29.
 Seneca, Epistulae morales Liber 8, 70, 20.
 Martial, Epigrammata, Liber 12,48,7.

Secondary sources 
 Richard Neudecker: Die Pracht der Latrine. Zum Wandel öffentlicher Bedürfnisanstalten in der kaiserzeitlichen Stadt. Pfeil-Verlag, München 1994 (Studien zur antiken Stadt, Bd. 1) , pp. 36f.
 Gilbert Wiplinger: "Der Gebrauch des Xylospongiums – eine neue Theorie zu den hygienischen Verhältnissen in römischen Latrinen". In: SPA . SANITAS PER AQUAM. Tagungsband des Internationalen Frontinus-Symposiums zur Technik – und Kulturgeschichte der antiken Thermen Aachen, 18. – 22. März 2009. Frontinus-Gesellschaft e.V. & Peeters, Leiden 2012. . pp. 295–304.

Ancient Greek culture
Ancient Roman culture
History of water supply and sanitation
Sanitation
Waste management in Italy